Quatrocentão (feminine quatrocentona, plural quatrocentões) is a term used to designate members of elite families descendant from the early settlers and explorers of São Paulo. This term was first used in the early 20th century, in the past they were referred to as primeiros povoadores (first settlers) or nobreza da terra (nobility of the land). These families had occupied important positions as governors, military commanders, aldermen and explorers of early colonial South America.  They received large land grants from the Portuguese Crown and originated mostly in Portugal and Spain, but some in Flanders and other places in Europe.  A portion of the original settlers were noblemen of the Royal House of Portugal.  Under the rule of the Habsburgs and the Iberian Union, they were joined by Spanish families, some also of noble origin.   The earliest of these settlers married descendants of the Amerindian Chief of Piratininga, Martim Afonso Tibiriçá, and after intermarried frequently among the families in the Genealogia Paulistana, forming an endogamous group.  They were first listed in a genealogical study in the 1700s by Pedro Taques de Almeida Paes Leme and last listed in the classical genealogical work Genealogia Paulistana, published in 1905.

The quatrocentões and their ancestors were greatly responsible for the expansion of the Portuguese Empire in South America, at the expense of the Spanish Empire. Also the Brazilian Gold Rush, which had strong repercussion in Europe and in the Americas, the founding of many towns in Minas Gerais such as Ouro Preto, and also the first phase of the Industrialization of São Paulo during the Empire of Brazil.  But also for the maintenance of slavery in Brazil, making Brazil the last country in the Americas to abolish slavery in 1888.  In the 19th and early 20th century they formed a large portion of the plantation aristocrats and titled nobility of the Empire of Brazil. They became decadent after the financial crisis of 1929, the rise of new wealthy immigrants and the Revolution of 1932, that they lost against Getulio Vargas, ironically a descendant of these early settlers of São Paulo. Quatrocentões are a polarizing group in Brazilian history, praised by some and blamed by others for their actions during the course of Brazilian history.

Although no longer existing as a strong social group, one can still find among modern descendants of the early settlers of São Paulo many businessmen and members of the political elite in Brazil and elsewhere, both left-wing and right-wing.  They include presidents of Brazil; Brazilian senators, deputies and governors; the current Royal Family of Sweden; a branch of the princes of Löwenstein-Wertheim-Freudenberg and some members of the House of Orléans (Orléans-Braganza branch).

Meaning of the Term 

Quatrocentão is the Portuguese language augmentative for four hundred, implying that these families had been in São Paulo for four hundred years in the beginning of the 20th century, when the term became used to distinguish them from recent European and Middle Eastern (Syrian and Lebanese) immigrants.

Italian writer and journalist Corrado Pizzinelli defined them in the following way in 1955:

...they are something more than a noble, of the “true lord”, of the aristocrat, they are the authors and the censors of the Brazilian Gotha Almanach.  They are the holders and dispensers of being Brazilian.  For them, the world started four hundred years ago, when the first Portuguese and their families, from which they descend, arrived in Brazil. The quatrocentões are lovable, gentle and proud.  They have a strong sense of caste and are inaccessible: they constitute 70 percent of the ruling political class of Brazil, they defend themselves by every way from society.

Nobreza da Terra

The term nobreza da terra, Portuguese for "nobility of the land", was used not only in São Paulo but all over the Portuguese Empire to designate those that had the status of nobility under Portuguese legislation.  Beside the fact that they had to live as noblemen, they had to formalize their status by occupying either positions in the Royal Household of Portugal, to have been a knight in the military orders of Portugal, have instituted a majorat, have occupied a position in public administration or to have been a military officer.

History 
A number of renowned historians in Brazil had studied the history of the early settlers of S. Paulo and their descendants, including Sérgio Buarque de Holanda, Alfredo Ellis Junior, Caio Prado Júnior, Afonso d'Escragnolle Taunay, Antônio Castilho de Alcântara Machado and Washington Luís Pereira de Sousa.  All of them also descendants of these families or married into it.

Tibiriçá and João Ramalho

Timeline 
 
 1531 Martin Afonso de Sousa under orders of King Dom João III of Portugal leads a Portuguese armada destined to establish a colony in the Brazilian coast to counter Spanish and French expansion into Portuguese lands. In his armada he brings the first Portuguese families and settlers of São Paulo.
 1532  São Vicente, in the coast of the modern state of São Paulo, is founded as the first municipality of Brazil and Portuguese America.
 1534 King Dom João III of Portugal installs a system of hereditary fiefs called captaincies to promote the settling of Brazil.  Including the captaincies of São Vicente and Santo Amaro (modern states of São Paulo and Rio de Janeiro).  The first was given to Martim Afonso de Sousa, and the second to his brother Pero Lopes de Sousa.  The captain-general, in this case Martim Afonso de Sousa, had the right to appoint a lieutenant and Capitão-mor to govern in his place and receive the income from the fiefdom, that was divided among the family of Martim Afonso de Sousa, the appointed acting governor and the Crown.
 1543 Portuguese nobleman Brás Cubas founded the first Santa Casa da Misericórdia in Santos, the oldest charity organization in the Americas.
 1553 A fortified village by the name of Santo André da Borda do Campo is founded by João Ramalho. It is officially elevated to a municipal village by Tomé de Sousa and Brás Cubas. It was the first village founded by the Portuguese away from the coast.  It was located in the outskirts of what is today the city of São Paulo.
 1554 Jesuits Manuel da Nóbrega, St. José de Anchieta and others lay the foundations of the Jesuit mission of São Paulo dos Campos de Piratininga.  The future city of São Paulo.
 1560 The municipality of Santo André da Borda do Campo is transferred to São Paulo dos Campos de Piratininga to better defend and settle the area.
 1562 São Paulo is surrounded and attacked by native tribes against the establishment of the Portuguese and the Jesuits in the area, the troops leading the attack are commanded by Jaguaranho and Chief Piquerobi, nephew and brother of Chief Tibiriçá.  Leading the counterattack and defense of São Paulo was Chief Tibiriçá himself.  In the course of battle Tibiriçá killed his brother Piquerobi.  His nephew Jaguaranho was also killed in battle.
 1562 Death of Chief Tibiriçá, a couple of months after battle, he is given a solemn funeral rite by the Jesuits, including St. José de Anchieta, and is recognized as founder and protector of São Paulo. He is buried in the crypt of the São Paulo Cathedral.

Geographical presence in Brazil 

Beside their connection to the state of São Paulo, and given the expansionist nature of the early settlers already in the colonial period, today one can find their descendants in the states of Rio de Janeiro, Paraná, Santa Catarina, Rio Grande do Sul, Goiás, Mato Grosso do Sul, Mato Grosso and Minas Gerais. It has been estimated mathematically that around 15 million Brazilians are descendants of these early settlers (less than 10% of the Brazilian population).

Traditional institutions

Families in the Genealogia Paulistana 
These are only the chapter heads chosen by author Silva Leme for his book Genealogia Paulistana, many other families are part of the book, all of them married into these families listed below, an index can be found in the final book with all the families up to 1905.

Representation in the Media

Recent research

Jewish origin of some families

Descendants

See also 
 Brazilian nobility
 Portuguese nobility
 Spanish nobility
 Fidalgo
 Fazenda
 Coronelism
 Café com leite politics
 Caramuru
 Casa grande (sugar plantation) 
 Slavery in Brazil

Similar elites in the Americas 

First Families of Virginia
Encomenderos
Boston Brahmin
Family Compact of Upper Canada
Canadian peers and baronets
Seigneurial system of New France
Mexican Nobility
Ranchos of California
Cuban nobility
Criollo

References

Brazilian families
History of São Paulo (state)